Elberon is a railway station in the Elberon section of Long Branch, Monmouth County, New Jersey, United States. The station is served by New Jersey Transit's North Jersey Coast Line. Located at the intersection of Lincoln Avenue and Truax Road, It is the first station south of the electrified section of the line. The station has two side level high-level platforms and 229 parking spaces for commuter use.

History 
Elberon station opened in 1876 as the fourth of four stations on the New York and Long Branch Railroad, a railroad jointly owned and operated by the Pennsylvania Railroad and the Central Railroad of New Jersey. The railroad had a station downtown, along with stops at West End (Hollywood) and nearby Branchport. The depot caught fire on November 26, 1898 after burning telegraph wires ignited the depot, along with stations at Avon, Branchport and Asbury Park. Elberon burned completely while the rest suffered minor damage.

Elberon's depot was added to the New Jersey and National Registers of Historic Places in 1978. However, the depot caught fire on May 27, 1988, a complete loss. In October 1993, construction began on a replacement, which was finished and opened on June 3, 1996.

Station layout
The station has high-level side platforms.

See also
Garfield Tea House
Operating Passenger Railroad Stations Thematic Resource (New Jersey)

References

Long Branch, New Jersey
NJ Transit Rail Operations stations
Railway stations on the National Register of Historic Places in New Jersey
Stations on the North Jersey Coast Line
Railway stations in the United States opened in 1876
Railway stations in Monmouth County, New Jersey
National Register of Historic Places in Monmouth County, New Jersey
Former New York and Long Branch Railroad stations